Hector "Torten" Goetinck (5 March 1886 – 26 June 1943) was a Belgian football (soccer) player and manager. He coached the Belgium national football team in the 1930 FIFA World Cup and the 1934 FIFA World Cup, and also coached Club Brugge K.V. During his playing days he earned 17 caps for Belgium and also played for Club Brugge. He was born in Bruges, and died in Knokke-Heist during a World War II bombing raid.

References

External links
 
 Biography at Club Brugge
 

1886 births
1943 deaths
Belgian footballers
Belgium international footballers
Club Brugge KV players
Belgian football managers
1930 FIFA World Cup managers
1934 FIFA World Cup managers
Belgium national football team managers
Club Brugge KV head coaches
Footballers from Bruges
Association football midfielders
Belgian civilians killed in World War II
Deaths by airstrike during World War II